Papyrus Oxyrhynchus 112 (P. Oxy. 112 or P. Oxy. I 112) is an invitation to a festival, written in Greek and discovered in Oxyrhynchus. The manuscript was written on papyrus in the form of a sheet. The document was written in the late 3rd or early 4th century. Currently it is housed in the Vaughan Library at the Harrow School in Harrow on the Hill.

Description 
The document is an invitation from Petosiris to Serenia to visit in order to attend a festival. The measurements of the fragment are 75 by 85 mm.

It was discovered by Grenfell and Hunt in 1897 in Oxyrhynchus. The text was published by Grenfell and Hunt in 1898.

Text
Greeting, my dear Serenia, from Petosiris. Be sure, dear, to come up on the 20th for the birthday festival of the god, and let me know whether you are coming by boat or by donkey, in order that we may send for you accordingly. Take care not to forget. I pray for your continued health.

See also 
 Oxyrhynchus Papyri
 Papyrus Oxyrhynchus 111
 Papyrus Oxyrhynchus 113

References 

112
3rd-century manuscripts
4th-century manuscripts